Helix (Rafael Carago) is a mutate superhero appearing in American comic books published by Marvel Comics. He was created by Tom DeFalco and Todd DeZago in Spider-Man: Maximum Clonage Alpha (part of the Clone Saga). His first appearance as a New Warrior was in The New Warriors #62.

Fictional character biography
A villain calling himself Spidercide released an improved version of the Carrion Virus in Springdale, Pennsylvania, killing the entire population of the town. Spidercide and his master the Jackal later discovered that there was a single survivor. Rafael Carago was discovered by agents of the Centers for Disease Control. Rafael's skin had hardened and darkened by the time CDC were able to sedate him, he tore himself free and escaped.

The New Warriors and the Scarlet Spider showed up, and beat Rafael unconscious. He was then taken into custody by Project: Pegasus, but Spidercide replaced a helicopter pilot, and escaped with Helix. The Jackal further experimented on a helpless Rafael, mutating him further. The Jackal was unable to discover how Helix developed Adaptoid powers, and during a clone revolt in his labs, Helix escaped.

After a battle in downtown Manhattan between a hallucinating Helix and the Warriors, The Scarlet Spider was able to wrap Helix in a web cocoon and used his stinger dart launchers to inject Rafael with the same hypermorphic serum that knocked him unconscious in their earlier battle. The serum worked and Helix reverted to his normal form. The Scarlet Spider also realized that if nobody attacked Helix, his body would have nothing to adapt to, and would return to normal.

After a series of adventures alongside the Warriors Helix haltingly said his goodbyes in English to Turbo, and promised to call if he needed help, then took off on a quest to find himself.

Powers and abilities
Helix is a reactive Adaptoid, meaning he can subconsciously recode his DNA in response to threatening outside stimuli. Helix is able to alter, or evolve, his body to physically counter kinetic energy or energy-based threats to his well-being. He can increase in size and strength, cancel psychokinetic energies in his vicinity, and adapt to any environmental toxin. His body automatically subconsciously adapts to counter any threat. After the crisis has passed, Helix's body resets itself to its baseline form. His body's adaptive capabilities allowed him to go toe-to-toe with alternate versions of Wonder Man and Charlie-27 at the same time.

Other versions

Timeslip's vision
Timeslip saw a possible vision of Justice, Powerhouse, and Helix falling into a spiral, which may have been a dimensional or time portal.

References

External links

Helix at Marvel Database
Helix at Comic Vine

Fictional characters who can change size
Marvel Comics characters with superhuman strength
Marvel Comics mutates
Marvel Comics superheroes